Canadian Memorial Chiropractic College (CMCC) is a Canadian private chiropractic school located in the North York district of Toronto, founded in 1945. CMCC is a registered charitable not-for-profit corporation and receives no direct government funding. It awards Doctor of Chiropractic degrees under ministerial consent from the provincial Ministry of Colleges and Universities.

Education 
CMCC's Doctor of Chiropractic program, a post-secondary professional educational program, is accredited by the Council on Chiropractic Education Canada of the Federation of Canadian Chiropractic Regulatory and Educational Accrediting Boards.

Undergraduate 
CMCC's undergraduate program is a second entry degree program. It is offered to qualified applicants who have completed at least three years of university level education prior to their admission. The curriculum consists of 4,200+ hours of education broken into four years of study. The first two years of study emphasize foundational biological science courses (anatomy, pathology, physiology, microbiology, etc.), whereas the final two years include professional courses in chiropractic studies, psychomotor skills, clinical education, business, jurisprudence, ethics, research, professionalism, etc. Year IV consists of two six-month internships in CMCC community-based clinics, or on an externship basis.

With the Gross Anatomy Laboratory, CMCC is one of only 10 educational institutions designated as a school of anatomy under the authority of the Anatomy Act of the Province of Ontario.

Graduate 

CMCC's Graduate Studies program offers advanced study in clinical skills, research, teaching, learning and leadership. The Chiropractic Residency Programs include Diagnostic Imaging, Clinical and Sports Sciences.

As of September 2017, the Work Disability Prevention program is now offered in collaboration with the University of Ontario Institute of Technology (UOIT).

Research  
The foundation of CMCC's research agenda includes special research centres – one which studies the biomechanics of treatment and outcome, and another to study implications on health policy and patient access to treatment. In 2012, in collaboration with the University of Ontario Institute of Technology (UOIT), CMCC opened the Centre for Disability Prevention and Rehabilitation. Research informs the undergraduate curriculum, contributes to the body of chiropractic knowledge, elevates the quality of CMCC's education program, and improves patient care.

The completion of a research-related literature synthesis is a requirement of the Doctor of Chiropractic program. An elective research project is available to those students who have special interest or are considering a research track in their career.

The CMCC campus has research laboratories, including a Biomechanics and Elastography Laboratory, a Tissue Testing Laboratory, a Materials Fabrication Laboratory, a Neurophysiology Laboratory, and a Cellular and Molecular Biology and Histology Laboratory.

In 2001, CMCC established the McMorland Family Research Chair in Mechanobiology, the research chair position in an independent chiropractic institution.

Patient care  
The Division of Clinical Education offers clinical services for the Greater Toronto Area (GTA). Five clinics are available to the public.

Since 2012, CMCC has had an expanded presence at the Family Health Team clinic, part of the Department of Family and Community Medicine at Toronto's St. Michael's Hospital.

Notable alumni

 Ruby Dhalla, politician
 Josh Binstock, Olympic volleyball player
 Colin Carrie, politician
 Gary Goodyear, politician

See also
 Ontario Student Assistance Program
 Higher education in Ontario
 Canadian College of Naturopathic Medicine

References

External links
 Canadian Memorial Chiropractic College

Chiropractic schools
Universities and colleges in Toronto
Educational institutions established in 1945
1945 establishments in Ontario